The 40th World Artistic Gymnastics Championships were held at the Hanns-Martin-Schleyer-Halle in Stuttgart, Germany, from 1 to 9 September 2007.

Medal summary

Men's results

Qualification 
Oldest and youngest competitors

Team all-around

All-around

Floor Exercise

Pommel Horse

Rings

Vault

Parallel Bars

Horizontal Bar

Women's results

Qualification
Oldest and youngest competitors

Team all-around

Vault incident 
During the team finals, Russian team member Ekaterina Kramarenko balked on her vault attempt as a result of being off-step. To avoid injury, she did not perform her vault and slowed down before she hit the apparatus, stepping onto the springboard and touching the vault table. Thinking she would be able to perform another vault, Kramarenko walked back down the runway but was escorted off the floor. The judges immediately gave her a score of "0", which was counted as one of three scores for the team's vaulting apparatus. This score was assigned in observation of section 8.1 of the WAG Code of Points, which states that a gymnast is not allowed a second attempt if she has touched the springboard or vault itself in any way on her first attempt, and with which coaches and gymnasts are expected to be familiar.

The Russian team petitioned that Kramarenko's qualification score of 13.725 be able to carry over as a mock-compulsory score, but were refused. In another petition to have Russian team members Yulia Lozhechko and Elena Zamolodchikova's vaulting scores averaged and then counted, Russia was again refused. When asked to comment on the incident, Russian coach Andrei Rodionenko explained, "Nobody knows what happened, it was a shock for everyone."

Any team that scratched on vault would have immediately finished last in the competition, whether it be in first or last rotation.

All-around

Vault

Uneven Bars

Balance Beam

Floor Exercise

Medal count

Overall

Men

Women

Notes

External links
Official website

 
World Artistic Gymnastics Championships - Women's floor exercise
World Artistic Gymnastics Championships
Sports competitions in Stuttgart
G
International gymnastics competitions hosted by Germany
2000s in Baden-Württemberg